Terry Wellesley (born July 10, 1948) is a retired Canadian football player who played for the Ottawa Rough Riders and 	Hamilton Tiger-Cats. He played college football at the Tennessee Technological University.

References

1948 births
Living people
Ottawa Rough Riders players